Back to Yellow Jacket is a 1922 American silent Western film directed by Ben F. Wilson and starring Roy Stewart, Kathleen Kirkham and Earl Metcalfe.

Cast
 Roy Stewart as Jim Ballantyne 
 Kathleen Kirkham as Carmen, his wife
 Earl Metcalfe as Flush Kirby
 Jack Pratt as William Carson
 Bessie Loo

References

Bibliography
 Connelly, Robert B. The Silents: Silent Feature Films, 1910-36, Volume 40, Issue 2. December Press, 1998.

External links
 

1922 films
1922 Western (genre) films
1920s English-language films
American silent feature films
Silent American Western (genre) films
American black-and-white films
Films directed by Ben F. Wilson
Arrow Film Corporation films
1920s American films